Floris II, called Floris the Fat ( – 2 March 1121) was the first from the native dynasty of Holland to be called Count of Holland, reigning from 1091 until his death.

Life 
Floris was the son of his predecessor Dirk V and his wife Othilde. Floris II ended the conflict with the Bishop of Utrecht (which he inherited from his father, and should be seen in light of the power struggle between the Pope and the Holy Roman Emperor), most likely by becoming his vassal. In 1101 he was endowed with the title of Count of Holland by the bishop of Utrecht, after acquiring Rhineland (Leiden and surroundings) ('comes de Hollant', up until that time the counts' dominion had been officially referred to as Frisia).

Around 1108, Floris II married Gertrude, the daughter of Theodoric II, Duke of Lorraine. Gertrude changed her name to Petronilla (after a saint venerated as the daughter of Peter), in recognition of her loyalty to the Holy See. Petronilla and Floris II had four children, three boys and one girl: Dirk, Floris, Simon and Hedwig, respectively. Dirk became his successor, Dirk VI of Holland, while Floris became known as Floris the Black and contested his brother's power.

Bibliography
Wessels, Johannes Willhelmus (1908). History of the Roman-Dutch Law. Cape Town: The African Book Company.

Counts of Holland
11th-century births
1121 deaths
Burials at Egmond Abbey
People from Vlaardingen
11th-century people of the Holy Roman Empire
12th-century people of the Holy Roman Empire